Azara serrata, the saw-toothed azara, is a species of flowering plant in the family Salicaceae, native to Chile. In temperate regions it requires a sheltered position.

This plant has gained the Royal Horticultural Society's Award of Garden Merit.

References 

Salicaceae